Baskeleh may refer to:
Baskeleh-ye Boruvim
Baskeleh-ye Cheshmeh Sefid
Baskeleh-ye Dar Anbar
Baskeleh-ye Garmeh
Baskeleh-ye Khan Mirza
Baskeleh-ye Vasat